Nalanda College, Biharsharif is a college in Bihar Sharif, the district headquarters of Nalanda District in Bihar state in India. It is a constituent unit of Patliputra University. It was established in 1870 and is one of the oldest colleges of north India. Its catchment area includes nearby villages and small towns in Bihar Sharif. The Government of India issued stamps with its picture in 1970 to mark its centenary. This college offers undergraduate and postgraduate courses in science, commerce and arts.

History

Bihar Sharif Nalanda College was founded by Canto Singh, a landlord in Bihar. He had granted 8.7 acres of land for the college. To remember his contribution, his statue is standing in the campus. The college was built in the area having the remains of an ancient fort, which is believed to have been a part of Odantapuri university.

The college was at first under the jurisdiction of the University of Calcutta, then it came under Bihar University, and finally under Magadh University, Bodhgaya. D. P. Singh was appointed principal of the college. After his retirement, Dr. S. N. Sinha took the charge as the principal of this college.

Notable Professors
Siddheswar Prasad, Served as MP from Nalanda and Governor of Tripura

Notable alumni
Veer Pratap Singh - Indian cricketer

References

External links
 http://nalandacollegepup.com/

Universities and colleges in Bihar
Education in Nalanda district
Educational institutions established in 1870
1870 establishments in India

Constituent colleges of Patliputra University